Holwell Quarries is a  geological Site of Special Scientific Interest at Holwell near Nunney on the Mendip Hills in Somerset, notified in 1952.

Holwell Quarries represent an internationally important geological locality. A comprehensive assemblage of Triassic (including Rhaetic), Lower Jurassic and Middle Jurassic fissure fillings are well displayed. The Rhaetic fissure fillings have yielded the richest assemblage of vertebrate faunas known from the British Triassic. Fissure deposits have also yielded 8 or 9 genera of Reptiles: a Crocodilian, a Placodont (the first record in Britain of this sub-order), and the dinosaurs Thecodontosaurus and Palaeosaurus. The Lower Jurassic fissure fillings yield ammonites and brachiopods which are important in dating these deposits.

See also
 Quarries of the Mendip Hills

Sources
 English Nature citation sheet for the site (accessed 10 August 2006)

External links
 English Nature website (SSSI information)

Sites of Special Scientific Interest in Somerset
Sites of Special Scientific Interest notified in 1952
Geology of Somerset
Quarries in the Mendip Hills